The 1986 Isle of Man TT was held from 31 May to 6 June 1986 on the Snaefell Mountain Course on the Isle of Man. The weather severely disrupted the programme, shaking up the races and producing some unexpected, but worthy, wins.

Four riders died: Ian Ogden and Alan Jarvis in training and Andy Cooper in the Senior TT race at Ballig. Gene McDonnell died in what has been described as "the most horrific accident ever witnessed at the TT", when a horse was startled by a helicopter, jumped into the road and collided with McDonnell. Both horse and rider were killed instantly.

Senior TT (500 cc) classification 
Source: IOMTT

Production Class D TT classification 
Source: IOMTT

Formula One TT classification 
Source: IOMTT

References 

Isle of Man TT
Isle of Man TT
June 1986 sports events in the United Kingdom
Isle